A reactor operator (or nuclear reactor operator) is an individual at a nuclear power plant who is responsible for directly controlling a nuclear reactor from a control panel and is the only individual at a nuclear power plant who can directly alter significant amounts of reactor reactivity.  The reactor operator occupies a position of great responsibility that may require him or her to start up a nuclear reactor, shut down a nuclear reactor, monitor reactor parameters, or respond to a casualty of the nuclear reactor. 

All reactor operators are required to be licensed or qualified by their respective governing body (for example, the NRC for U.S. civilian nuclear reactors and Naval Reactors for U.S. naval reactors).

Civilian reactor operators are individuals with enormous responsibilities to protect the health and the safety and their site and the public. The job can be extremely stressful and requires individuals to maintain high awareness of the controls. The high mental standard required for the job is often compared to that of naval aviators.

The median annual salary for a licensed reactor operator is $140,000 - $200,000 a year plus bonuses and other monetary benefits. The job outlook for the near future predicts a 10% growth with many people retiring.

United States

Civilian reactor operator licensing
There are two types of civilian reactor operators licensed by the NRC: reactor operators (RO) and senior reactor operators (SRO).

Reactor operator
A reactor operator is an individual who has met the licensing requirements of 10 CFR 55 and NUREG-1021 for being a reactor operator.  These requirements include:
A high school diploma
At least 3 years of power plant experience with at least 1 year of experience at the nuclear power plant where the individual is licensed (not including time spent as a control room operator).
At least 6 months of experience performing plant operational duties at the nuclear power plant where the individual is licensed
At least 3 months of experience as a control room operator at the nuclear power plant where the individual is licensed
Completion of the nuclear power plant's reactor operator training program
Supervised manipulation of the controls of the nuclear reactor for certain operations affecting reactor power level
A successful medical examination meeting NRC requirements
Passing the NRC Generic Fundamentals Examination
Passing the nuclear power plant's reactor operator test
Passing the nuclear power plant's Operating Test (approved by the NRC) which covers knowledge of the nuclear power plant components, knowledge of casualty response, and responses to simulated casualties and plant evolutions in an approved simulator.

A reactor operator is licensed to manipulate the controls of a nuclear reactor which may alter reactivity and change the power level.  Typically, this means that a reactor operator is qualified to remotely operate control rods and other remote actions required to control the reactor as desired (within regulatory requirements).

Senior reactor operator
A senior reactor operator is an individual who has met the licensing requirements of 10 CFR 55 and NUREG-1021 for being a senior reactor operator.  These requirements are similar to the requirements for a reactor operator, except:
At least 3 years of site specific nuclear power plant experience is required instead of 3 years of general power plant experience
A bachelor's degree in engineering, engineering technology, or physical science is required unless the operator has had 1 year of experience as a licensed reactor operator or 2 years of experience qualified in certain senior watch stations in the Naval Nuclear Propulsion Program (including that of a naval reactor operator).
Fulfilling certain supervisory functions as a trainee.
Completion of the nuclear power plant's senior reactor operator training program
Passing the nuclear power plant's senior reactor operator test which includes an administrative section in addition to the reactor operator test.
Passing a more extensive plant Operating Test which also includes supervisory and administrative actions.

A senior reactor operator is licensed to manipulate the controls of a nuclear reactor and direct others to manipulate controls.  A senior reactor operator is the senior watch stander in a control room and is responsible for directing the operation of the nuclear reactor as desired (within regulatory requirements). They also are licensed to perform fuel movement/core alterations within the reactor vessel (only SRO and Limited SROs are allowed to do this).

A senior reactor operator licensee (like aviation pilots and masters of ships at sea) is authorized by law to depart from regulations during emergencies. 10CFR50.54(x) states they may "take reasonable action that departs from a license condition or a technical specification (contained in a license issued under this part) in an emergency when this action is immediately needed to protect the public health and safety and no action consistent with license conditions and technical specifications that can provide adequate or equivalent protection is immediately apparent." and 10CFR50.54(y) "Licensee action permitted by paragraph (x) of this section shall be approved, as a minimum, by a licensed senior operator, or, at a nuclear power reactor facility for which the certifications required under Sec. 50.82(a)(1) have been submitted, by either a licensed senior 
operator or a certified fuel handler, prior to taking the action."

Trainee
The only other person who may manipulate the controls of a US civilian nuclear power reactor is an individual who:
Is under the direction and in the presence of a licensed operator or senior operator and
Manipulates the controls of a facility as a part of the individual's training and
Is enrolled in the facility licensee's training program as approved by the Commission to qualify for an operator license under 10CFR Part 55

References

Nuclear power stations